Amnesia is the second album by the rock band Pousette-Dart Band, released in 1977. The album drew a mostly negative review from David Cleary of Allmusic, who awarded the album 2.5 stars. He called it "bland" and the lyrics "noncommittal", and compared it to The Eagles and James Taylor. He said that "Yaicha" was "easily the album's best song," and "a brief and lovely singer-songwriter number with an attractive melody and intriguing chord changes."

The song "Fall on Me" was featured in the 11th episode of the second season of Lost.

Track listing
All songs composed by Jon Pousette-Dart except where noted.
"County Line" (John Curtis, Jon Pousette-Dart) – 3:28 
"Fall on Me" – 2:25    
"Amnesia" – 3:11 
"I Think I Know" – 3:11   
"May You Dance" – 3:20  
"I Don't Know Why" – 3:06   
"Winterness" – 3:03 
"Who's That Knocking" (John Curtis) – 2:54 
"Listen to the Spirit" – 3:30 
"Yaicha" – 2:00

Personnel
Jon Pousette-Dart - vocals, acoustic and electric guitar, slide guitar
John Curtis - electric and acoustic guitar, mandolin, banjo, vocals
John Folsom Troy - bass guitar, vocals
Norbert Putnam - synthesizer, Fender Rhodes
Michael Utley, Bobby Emmons - keyboards
Kenneth Buttrey, Jeff Teague, Allison Cook - drums, percussion
Farrell Morris - percussion
Harvey Thompson - tenor saxophone
Billy Puett - flute
Ginger Holladay, Janie Fricke, Lea Jane Berinati - backing vocals

Chart positions

References

1977 albums
Pousette-Dart Band albums
Albums produced by Norbert Putnam
Capitol Records albums